Mummies 3D: Secrets of the Pharaohs is a 2007 IMAX film documenting Egypt's mummies as part historical recreation, and part archaeological expedition. Co-produced by the Franklin Institute, it was the companion film to the museum's Tutankhamun exhibition. The movie features Zahi Hawass and was narrated by Christopher Lee with a runtime of 39 minutes.

References

2007 films
2007 short documentary films
IMAX short films
Films set in Egypt
Films shot in Egypt
IMAX documentary films
Films scored by Sam Cardon